Alexander MacDonald  "Sandy" Keith (November 22, 1928 – October 3, 2020) was an American politician and jurist who was the first person to hold office in each of the three branches of Minnesota state government, serving as state senator, the 37th Lieutenant Governor, and as an associate justice and later chief justice of the Minnesota Supreme Court.

Early life
Keith was born in Rochester, Minnesota, to Norman M. Keith and Edna (Alexander) Keith. His father was a physician who practiced medicine at the Mayo Clinic. He married Marion E. Sanford on April 29, 1955. Keith graduated magna cum laude from Amherst College in 1950, and from Yale Law School in 1953. He then served in the United States Marine Corps during the Korean War.

Career
After returning to his hometown of Rochester, Keith took a job as counsel with the Mayo Clinic, where he worked with future U.S. Supreme Court Justice Harry Blackmun.

In 1959, he was elected to the Minnesota State Senate as a member of the Democratic-Farmer-Labor Party (DFL). During his tenure as a state senator, Keith served as a delegate to the 1960 Democratic National Convention. He was Lieutenant Governor of Minnesota under Governor Karl Rolvaag from 1963 until 1967. He challenged Rolvaag for the nomination to be the DFL's candidate for governor in the 1966 general election, but was defeated by Rolvaag in the primary election.

In 1989, Keith began serving as a justice of the Minnesota Supreme Court. He became chief justice in 1990 and served in that capacity until 1998.

Death 
Keith died at his home on October 3, 2020. He was 91 years old.

References

External links
Sandy Keith at Political Graveyard

Minnesota State Law Library biography: Alexander M. Keith
The Harvard Crimson 11/1/1966: "How to Get Mangled in Minnesota Politics: Sandy Keith Succumbs to Sympathy Vote"

1928 births
2020 deaths
Politicians from Rochester, Minnesota
Military personnel from Minnesota
Lieutenant Governors of Minnesota
Democratic Party Minnesota state senators
Amherst College alumni
Yale Law School alumni
Chief Justices of the Minnesota Supreme Court
Minnesota state court judges